Springfield Township is one of the ten townships of Clark County, Ohio, United States. As of the 2010 census the population was 12,237.

Geography
Located at the center of the county, it borders the following townships:
Moorefield Township - north
Harmony Township - east
Madison Township - southeast corner
Green Township - south
Mad River Township - southwest
Bethel Township - west
German Township - northwest

Most of the township is occupied by the city of Springfield, the county seat of Clark County.

Name and history
It is one of eleven Springfield Townships statewide.

Government
The township is governed by a three-member board of trustees, who are elected in November of odd-numbered years to a four-year term beginning on the following January 1. Two are elected in the year after the presidential election and one is elected in the year before it. There is also an elected township fiscal officer, who serves a four-year term beginning on April 1 of the year after the election, which is held in November of the year before the presidential election. Vacancies in the fiscal officership or on the board of trustees are filled by the remaining trustees.

References

External links
Township website
County website

Townships in Clark County, Ohio
Townships in Ohio